The Brooklyn Heist (also released as Capers), is a 2008 film written by Julian Mark Kheel and Brett Halsey and directed by Julian Mark Kheel.

Cast
 Danny Masterson as Fitz
 Leon Robinson as Ronald 
 Aysan Çelik as Lana
 Michael Cecchi as Dino
 Serena Reeder as Maya
 Jonathan Hova as Slava
 Blanchard Ryan as Samantha
 Dominique Swain as Mercy
 Phyllis Somerville as Connie
 MuMs da Schemer as Moose
 Barney Cheng as Bo
 Joe Rosario as Goon

External links
 

2008 films
2000s English-language films
2000s crime comedy films
2000s heist films
American crime comedy films
American heist films
2008 comedy films
2000s American films